Shelton Diggs (born April 23, 1955) is a former American football wide receiver. He played for the New York Jets in 1977.

References

1955 births
Living people
American football wide receivers
USC Trojans football players
New York Jets players